Bhidauni is a village and Gram panchayat of two villages, Kewat Nagla and Bhidauni officially known as Bhidauni Bangar located between the Yamuna river and Yamuna Expressway in the Mat Tehsil of Mathura district, Uttar Pradesh, India.

History 
Bhidouni village is situated in the foothills of Yamuna which is like a telenuma.  In the 19th century, here the identity of the village was on the name of called Dambar Baghel because the people knew the miscreant's village in Mathura district. In modern times sand mines and landfields are active in the area.

Geography

Bhidauni has an average elevation of 189 metres (600 feet).

Topography 
According to the geographical location of Bhiduni village, it is a rural area in the foothills of Yamuna, the plains here are full of sand, which collects river and rain water every year in the area near the river. The soil of Bhidauni Khadar is mainly sandy and alluvial soil is also found in some part of the village.

Climate  
The climate of Bhidauni has a semi-arid climate which is a tropical monsoon one. Mild winters, dry summers, hot sun and hot winds are common in the village, which is also known as rural heat, and is the monsoon season. There is a slight variation in the monsoon, but it rains here with occasional light showers, not as heavy as monsoon in other parts of India.

Water Management 
There is a problem of saline water in the village. The village man has to bring the nearby tubewell and well water to the portable drinking water. farmer's now using deep borewell for farming. With the problem of salt water now drinking water is also being contaminated.

Demographics

Population 
The residents or natives of Bhidauni and surroundings are called Brijwasi. The village had a population of 3,256 at the time of the 2011 census of India. The sex ratio was 880 and child sex ratio is 890. Uttar Pradesh state average for both ratios is 912 and 902 respectively.

There are no people from Scheduled Tribes in the village. The Schedule Castes, constitute 30.01% of the population

Ethnicity 
Caste and society are mainly social system which is determined on karma in which there are four varnas respectively, Brahmin, Kshatriya, Vaishya, and Shudra are included. In which the sub-castes are also divided, which are inhabited by the scheduled tribes like Jatav, Baghel, Kumhar, Khatik, Ahir, etc. respectively.

Religion 
Hinduism and Islam are main religions in the village.  Bhidauni sees heightened activities during the major festivities dedicated to Krishna Janmashtami, Raksha Bandhan, Diwali, Holi are the most celebrated festivals in the village.  A fair is organized every year in the village after the complete of Ramleela play.

Languages 
The native language of Bhidauni is Hindi and Braj Bhasha.

Government and politics

Civic Administration  
Bhidauni is administrated by a Pradhan (Head of Village) who is an elected representative. The village follows the Panchayati raj system.

List of Gram Pradhan

Ward Members 
Current civic administration body of village consists of 14 ward members elected in 2021.

Politics
Mant (Assembly constituency) is the Vidhan Sabha constituency. Mathura (Lok Sabha constituency) is the parliamentary constituency.

Civic Utility / Amenities / Services  
Medical/health
There is no hospital or health centre in the village, so its residents have to go to nearby towns and cities for treatment. After years in 2020–21, dozens of people died of dengue fever in Bhidauni village, hundreds of people have come under dengue fever, on the orders of the village district magistrate, the primary primary school of the village has been made a temporary hospital and a 24-hour ambulance facility has been made. People have taken it as an epidemic.

Cowshed (Gaushaala)

Disturbed by the bovine wandering in the open in the village, farmers barricaded the wires on the land of cows and closed more than 200 cows in the open and a temporary cowshed has been built, the villagers provided fodder water for the cows a committee has been constituted to take care of and according to the Department of Revenue, this gaushala has been built on government land and for this, there are assurances by the officials about some grants from the government, but till now neither the grant from the Yogi government nor any facility has been received for the gaushala.

Economy 
The village's main occupation is agriculture. Farmers mainly produce wheat, mustard (or rapeseed), potato and other vegetables. Production of paddy has been introduced recently with the introduction of deep bore-wells. Sub-soil water is the main source of irrigation. Farmer use tractors for farm works. Many families there live in poverty. Some are farm workers, some of the people go to neighbouring cities for extra income or their livelihood.

Some people work near the cities and some are involved in defence services. There are also poor labourers who work at the local brick kilns

Transport 

Villagers have been using their personal vehicles to reach travel from one place to other villages and the city. For travelling to nearby villages motorcycle, Tractor are more popular. Bullcart or camel cart are still used in villages as means of transport.

By Rail  

The nearest railway stations in and around Bhidauni Bangar:
 Chhata Railway Station .
 Kosi Kalan Railway Station, .
 Raya Railway Station . (via Raya — Mant Rd)

By Road  

Bhidauni Village is connected to major road Yamuna Expressway though Raya Cut & Vrindavan Cut and Surir bypass is also afflicted to get off but not an authorized Stop. Raya  — Bajna Road also connects to Mathura and in fact shortest way to reach Bhidauni vai Surir by road.

By Air  
Airports present near Bhidauni are:
Aligarh Airport .
Agra Air Force Station .
Safdarjung Airport .

Education 
There is a primary school and Government Higher Secondary School run by the Uttar Pradesh Board of Secondary Education, there is a hand pump and a summerable pump for the provision of fresh water for the children, there is a children's play garden which is in the school courtyard around which And green trees are planted. There is also a private school, Hariram Inter College, which is recognized by the Uttar Pradesh government, but the children of the village study up to Intermediate.

Schools

 Prathmik Vidyalaya Bhidauni 
Junior High School Bhidauni (Purva Madhyamik Vidyalaya)
 Government Higher Secondary School 
 Kundan Lal Hariram Inter College

Colleges
 Rashtriya Inter College Surir, Uttar Pradesh 281205

References

External links

 Official Facebook Page

 

Villages in Mathura district